Megami Tensei is a series of role-playing video games (RPGs) primarily developed by Atlus. It began with 1987's Digital Devil Story: Megami Tensei, which is based on Aya Nishitani's novel of the same name, and has spawned a sequel and several sub-series, such as the Persona and Devil Summoner series. The original Digital Devil Story: Megami Tensei games and the Shin Megami Tensei sub-series form the core of the series, while other entries are considered spin-offs.

Early games have received infrequent releases outside Japan: the first title to be released in North America was 1995's Jack Bros., and the first Megami Tensei RPG  released in the region was 1996's Revelations: Persona. The first game released in the PAL region was 2003's Shin Megami Tensei: Nocturne, which was released there in 2005. The series has several recurring themes, including demon-summoning, Japanese folklore, and the occult. Despite its thematic roots in Japanese culture and mythology, it has found a cult following internationally. It is Atlus's flagship role-playing game series, and one of the biggest in the genre in Japan. Several other types of media based on the series have been made, including anime and manga.

Original series

Shin Megami Tensei

Last Bible

Majin Tensei

Devil Summoner

Persona

Devil Children

Mobile spin-off games

Other games

References

Megami Tensei
Lists of video games by franchise